The 32nd Film Independent Spirit Awards, honoring the best independent films of 2016, were presented by Film Independent on February 25, 2017. The nominations were announced on November 22, 2016. The ceremony was hosted by Nick Kroll and John Mulaney, and broadcast live on IFC. Online streaming service Sundance Now live-streamed the ceremony concurrently with the telecast with an on-demand version available on Sundance Now.

Winners and nominees

{| class=wikitable style="width=100%"
|-
!style="width=50%"| Best Feature
!style="width=50%"| Best Director
|-
| valign="top"|
Moonlight
 American Honey
 Chronic
 Jackie
 Manchester by the Sea
| valign="top"|
Barry Jenkins – Moonlight
 Andrea Arnold – American Honey
 Pablo Larraín – Jackie
 Jeff Nichols – Loving
 Kelly Reichardt – Certain Women
|-
!style="width=50%"| Best Male Lead
!style="width=50%"| Best Female Lead
|-
| valign="top"|
Casey Affleck – Manchester by the Sea as Lee Chandler
 David Harewood – Free in Deed as Abe Wilkins
 Viggo Mortensen – Captain Fantastic as Ben Cash
 Jesse Plemons – Other People as David Mulcahey
 Tim Roth – Chronic as David Wilson
| valign="top"|
Isabelle Huppert – Elle as Michèle Leblanc
 Annette Bening – 20th Century Women as Dorothea Fields
 Sasha Lane – American Honey as Star
 Ruth Negga – Loving as Mildred Loving
 Natalie Portman – Jackie as Jackie Kennedy
|-
!style="width=50%"| Best Supporting Male
!style="width=50%"| Best Supporting Female
|-
| valign="top"|
Ben Foster – Hell or High Water as Tanner Howard
 Ralph Fiennes – A Bigger Splash as Harry Hawkes
 Lucas Hedges – Manchester by the Sea as Patrick Chandler
 Shia LaBeouf – American Honey as Jake
 Craig Robinson – Morris from America as Curtis Gentry
| valign="top"|
Molly Shannon – Other People as Joanne Mulcahey
 Edwina Findley – Free in Deed as Melva Neddy
 Paulina García – Little Men as Leonor Calvelli
 Lily Gladstone – Certain Women as Jamie
 Riley Keough – American Honey as Krystal
|-
!style="width=50%"| Best Screenplay
!style="width=50%"| Best First Screenplay
|-
| valign="top"|
Barry Jenkins and Tarell Alvin McCraney – Moonlight
 Kenneth Lonergan – Manchester by the Sea
 Mike Mills – 20th Century Women
 Ira Sachs and Mauricio Zacharias – Little Men
 Taylor Sheridan – Hell or High Water
| valign="top"|
Robert Eggers – The Witch
 Chris Kelly – Other People
 Adam Mansbach – Barry
 Stella Meghie – Jean of the Joneses
 Craig Shilowich – Christine
|-
!style="width=50%"| Best First Feature
!style="width=50%"| Best Documentary Feature
|-
| valign="top"|
The Witch
 The Childhood of a Leader
 The Fits
 Other People
 Swiss Army Man
| valign="top"|
O.J.: Made in America
 13th
 Cameraperson
 I Am Not Your Negro
 Sonita
 Under the Sun
|-
!style="width=50%"| Best Cinematography
!style="width=50%"| Best Editing
|-
| valign="top"|
James Laxton – Moonlight
 Ava Berkofsky – Free in Deed
 Lol Crawley – The Childhood of a Leader
 Zach Kuperstein – The Eyes of My Mother
 Robbie Ryan – American Honey
| valign="top"|
Joi McMillon and Nat Sanders – Moonlight
 Matthew Hannam – Swiss Army Man
 Jennifer Lame – Manchester by the Sea
 Jake Roberts – Hell or High Water
 Sebastián Sepúlveda – Jackie
|-
! colspan="2" style="width=50%"| Best International Film
|-
| colspan="2" valign="top"|
Toni Erdmann (Germany / Romania) Aquarius (Brazil)
 Chevalier (Greece)
 My Golden Days (Trois souvenirs de ma jeunesse)  (France)
 Under the Shadow (Zeer-e sāye) (Iran / UK)
|}

Films with multiple nominations and awards

Special awards

John Cassavetes Award
 Spa Night
 Free in Deed
 Hunter Gatherer
 Lovesong
 Nakom

Robert Altman Award
(The award is given to its film director, casting director, and ensemble cast)

 Moonlight – Barry Jenkins, Yesi Ramirez, Mahershala Ali, Patrick Decile, Naomie Harris, Alex Hibbert, André Holland, Jharrel Jerome, Janelle Monáe, Jaden Piner, Trevante Rhodes and Ashton Sanders

Kiehl's Someone to Watch Award
Recognizes a talented filmmaker of singular vision who has not yet received appropriate recognition. The award includes a $25,000 unrestricted grant funded by Kiehl's since 1851.

 Anna Rose Holmer – The Fits
 Andrew Ahn – Spa Night
 Claire Carré – Embers
 Ingrid Jungermann – Women Who Kill

Piaget Producers Award
Honors emerging producers who, despite highly limited resources, demonstrate the creativity, tenacity and vision required to produce quality, independent films. The award includes a $25,000 unrestricted grant funded by Piaget.

 Jordana Mollick – Hello, My Name Is Doris
 Lisa Kjerulff – The Fits
 Melody C. Roscher and Craig Shilowich – Christine

Truer than Fiction Award
Presented to an emerging director of non-fiction features who has not yet received significant recognition. The award includes a $25,000 unrestricted grant.

 Nanfu Wang – Hooligan Sparrow
 Kristi Jacobson – Solitary
 Sara Jordenö – Kiki

References

External links
 

2016
Independent Spirit Awards